John Jairo Mosquera (born 15 January 1988) is a Colombian professional footballer who plays as a forward for Peruvian club Sporting Cristal.

He spent most of his professional career in Germany, including at Werder Bremen where he appeared in three Bundesliga matches. He also represented in the country Wacker Burghausen, Alemannia Aachen, Union Berlin and Energie Cottbus.

Club career
Born in Apartadó, Antioquia Department, Mosquera started his career in the youth teams of Millonarios FC, finishing his development at Club Atlético River Plate in Argentina. He returned to his country in July 2005 as he joined Unión Magdalena, where he played for half a year; while at the service of Millonarios, he became the youngest player to start a match in the Categoría Primera A at the age of 14.

A SV Werder Bremen scout spotted Mosquera at the South American Under-17 Championship, and signed him in January 2006 to a three-and-a-half-year contract. He was immediately loaned to Danish Superliga side SønderjyskE Fodbold.

In 2006–07, Mosquera was loaned to another club in the country, SV Wacker Burghausen of the second division. During the entire campaign, he scored only once (against SpVgg Unterhaching in a 2–0 away win) as the team finished in the penultimate position and were relegated.

Mosquera had a trial at FC Carl Zeiss Jena in summer 2007, but a heart attack made any eventual deal fall through. Having returned to Werder Bremen for 2007–08 – his league debut came on 3 November against F.C. Hansa Rostock and his first top-flight goal against FC Energie Cottbus 21 days later, always as a late substitute– he was loaned again in the 2008 January transfer window, to Alemannia Aachen in the second tier.

On 24 June 2008, Mosquera was once again loaned, rejoining SønderjyskE in a season-long move. He helped his team narrowly escape top-tier relegation and, after his return to Werder, renewed his link and was loaned immediately, now to 1. FC Union Berlin from Germany's division two.

In late January 2013, after a brief spell in China, Mosquera returned to Germany and its second division by joining Energie Cottbus. One year later, having failed to find the net during his stint, his contract was terminated.

International career
Mosquera was a member of the Colombia under-20 team at the 2007 South American U-20 Championship.

References

External links

1988 births
Living people
People from Apartadó
Sportspeople from Antioquia Department
Colombian footballers
Association football forwards
Categoría Primera A players
Categoría Primera B players
Millonarios F.C. players
Unión Magdalena footballers
Atlético Nacional footballers
Envigado F.C. players
Llaneros F.C. players
Bundesliga players
2. Bundesliga players
SV Werder Bremen II players
SV Werder Bremen players
SV Wacker Burghausen players
Alemannia Aachen players
1. FC Union Berlin players
FC Energie Cottbus players
Danish Superliga players
SønderjyskE Fodbold players
Chinese Super League players
Changchun Yatai F.C. players
Primeira Liga players
Gil Vicente F.C. players
Primera B de Chile players
Deportes La Serena footballers
Indian Super League players
NorthEast United FC players
Bolivian Primera División players
Royal Pari F.C. players
Club Always Ready players
Guabirá players
Peruvian Primera División players
Sporting Cristal footballers
Colombia under-20 international footballers
Colombian expatriate footballers
Expatriate footballers in Argentina
Expatriate footballers in Germany
Expatriate men's footballers in Denmark
Expatriate footballers in China
Expatriate footballers in Portugal
Expatriate footballers in Chile
Expatriate footballers in India
Expatriate footballers in Bolivia
Expatriate footballers in Peru
Colombian expatriate sportspeople in Argentina
Colombian expatriate sportspeople in Germany
Colombian expatriate sportspeople in Denmark
Colombian expatriate sportspeople in China
Colombian expatriate sportspeople in Portugal
Colombian expatriate sportspeople in Chile
Colombian expatriate sportspeople in India
Colombian expatriate sportspeople in Bolivia
Colombian expatriate sportspeople in Peru